Mamta Wahab is a Jatiya Party (Ershad) politician and a former member of parliament for Mymensingh-4. She is the older sister of Rowshan Ershad and was arrested on 14 December 1991 after her brother was removed from power.

Career
Wahab was elected to parliament from Mymensingh-4 as a Jatiya Party candidate in 1988. She served as the Deputy Minister of Health. Her sister, Rowshan Ershad, her brother-in-law, Hussain Mohammad Ershad, was the President of Bangladesh.

References

Jatiya Party politicians
2012 deaths
4th Jatiya Sangsad members
Government ministers of Bangladesh
Year of birth missing
Women members of the Jatiya Sangsad
20th-century Bangladeshi women politicians